The British Rock Meeting was a recurring outdoor rock festival usually held in Germany.

History
The first British Rock Meeting was held in 1971 and was a 2-day, 2-city event, with the bands playing in both Speyer, Germany and Vienna, Austria. The second, in 1972, was a 3-day festival held in Germersheim, Germany, with over 70,000 attendees. Some of the bands showcased at these events included Deep Purple, Rory Gallagher, Pink Floyd, Uriah Heep, Beggars Opera Status Quo, Fleetwood Mac and Rod Stewart. The whole affair was heavily sponsored by the American Army (50-70% of the audiences consisted of  G.I.'s).

The last of the British Rock Meetings was a one-day event produced on June 23,1979 at the Freilichtbühne Loreley in St. Goarshausen, Germany. Some notable performers at this event included Whitesnake, The Police, Dire Straits, Talking Heads, Barclay James Harvest and Dr. Feelgood.

References

Rock festivals in Germany
Rock festivals in Austria
Recurring events established in 1971
Recurring events disestablished in 1979